Yoon Deok-yeo (born 25 March 1961) is a South Korean soccer coach and former soccer player. He formerly coaches the South Korean national women's soccer team.

Career
Yoon played for the South Korean national men's soccer team at the 1990 FIFA World Cup in Italy, where he was sent off in their final group game against Uruguay.

Club career statistics

External links
 
 
 

1961 births
Living people
Association football defenders
South Korean footballers
South Korea international footballers
Ulsan Hyundai FC players
Pohang Steelers players
K League 1 players
1990 FIFA World Cup players
Sungkyunkwan University alumni
2015 FIFA Women's World Cup managers
Asian Games medalists in football
Footballers at the 1990 Asian Games
South Korea women's national football team managers
Asian Games bronze medalists for South Korea
Medalists at the 1990 Asian Games
2019 FIFA Women's World Cup managers
South Korean football managers